Since the January 6 United States Capitol attack, drag performances, particularly Drag Queen Story Hour, have been the target of protests in the US. In the second half of 2022, protests spread to the United Kingdom and towards the end of 2022, protests started in Canada, often met with counter-protests.

United States 
Protests against drag performances, especially Drag Queen Story Hour (also known as Drag Story Hour) increased in the US after January 6 United States Capitol attack. The most vocal opponents are mostly affiliated with alt-right groups. Fox News host Tucker Carlson suggested that drag events could "indoctrinate or sexualize" children. Protestors also have expressed concern homophobic conspiracy theories that performers are grooming children. The Anti-Defamation League reported that child abuse conspiracy theory has been fuelled by the Libs of TikTok far-right Twitter account. US organisation, the Gay & Lesbian Alliance Against Defamation reported over 120 threats against drag shows in the US in 2022. Flyers promoting protests to drag performances in the UK are shared in anti-vaccination themed Telegram groups.

United Kingdom 
In July 2022, right winged groups protested Drag Queen Story Hour at Reading Central Library in Berkshire. The event featured Sab Samuel performing in drag as Aida H Dee. Subsequent protests occurred in Crewe, Bristol, and at Glastonbury Public Library. In August 2022, 50 protestors were met with about 300 counter-protestors outside a drag event at Oxfordshire County Library; police kept the two groups separated. Also in August 2022, a drag show featuring Matthew Cavan performing as drag queen Cherri Ontop in Belfast was the target of a protest.

Canada 
On November 23, 2022, people protested a drag storytelling event in the Kitsilano neighbourhood of Vancouver. On November 25, 2022, people protested outside a Hamilton Public Library facility. The next day, Book Keeper independent book shop in Sarnia, was protested by men as it hosted its fourth Drag Queen Story Time event. Also in November 2022, an event at Kelseys Original Roadhouse in Burlington, featuring Guelph drag queen Crystal Quartz was cancelled following threats made towards the restaurant.

On December 19, 2022, fourteen protestors gathered outside Brockville Public Library in Ontario as it held its first Drag Story Time event. The protestors were met by counter protestors, which included the library's CEO. Police searched the library for explosive devices after a threat was uttered.

Twice in December 2022, protestors interrupted drag performances at the Britbar venue in Penticton BC, and at DunnEnzies restaurant in BC's Okanagan.

References

External links 

 Drag Story Hour - official website

2022 protests
2023 protests
Anti-drag sentiment
Drag events
2022 in Canada
2022 in the United States
2023 in the United States
2022 in the United Kingdom
Protests in Canada
Protests in the United Kingdom
Protests in the United States